The 2013 FIS Freestyle World Ski Championships were held at Voss, Norway from March 5–10, 2013.  Voss was acclaimed as the host in May 2008 as no other bids were received.    Skiers competed in six disciplines: Moguls, Dual Moguls, Ski Cross, Slopestyle, Half Pipe and Aerials.  These were the first FIS Freestyle World Ski Championships held in Norway.

Results

Men's events

Women's events

Medal table

References

External links
 Official Website

 
2013
2013 in freestyle skiing
2013 in Norwegian sport
International sports competitions hosted by Norway
Qualification events for the 2014 Winter Olympics
Freestyle skiing competitions in Norway